Plexippoides wesolowskae is a jumping spider species in the genus Plexippoides. The species was first named in 1998. It is found in Bangladesh.

References

Fauna of Bangladesh
Salticidae
Spiders of Asia
Spiders described in 1998